The Poppies  may refer to:

In music bands:
 The Poppies (American band)
 The Poppies (Welsh band)
 Les Poppys ("The Poppys"), French band
 Pop Will Eat Itself, sometimes referred to as The Poppies
In football teams:
 Bournemouth F.C., nicknamed The Poppies
 Kettering Town F.C., nicknamed The Poppies

See also 

 Poppies (disambiguation)
 Tall Poppies Records